The Kirriemuir Sculptured Stones are a series of Class II and III Pictish stones found in Kirriemuir, Angus, Scotland. Their existence points to Kirriemuir being an important ecclesiastical centre in the late first millennium AD.

Location
The stones were found in the grounds of Kirriemuir Kirk . The stones are now on display at the Meffan Institute in Forfar, Angus.

Description

Kirriemuir 1
The slab is carved on both faces in relief and, as it bears Pictish symbols, it falls into John Romilly Allen and Joseph Anderson's classification system as a class II stone. The stone bears a number of figural representations and a mirror and comb symbol. The figures have been identified as Saints Anthony and Paul.

The stone is one of the latest to include pictish symbols and can be dated with confidence to the late 9th/early 10th century.

Kirriemuir 2
Cross slab carved on both faces in relief. It too contains Pictish symbols and falls into John Romilly Allen and Joseph Anderson's classification system as a class II stone.

References

Gallery

Pictish stones
Pictish stones in Angus, Scotland
9th century in Scotland
9th-century sculptures